Freemasons are a DJ duo from Brighton, East Sussex, England. The act consists of the producers Russell Small (who is also one half of the house production duo Phats & Small) and James Wiltshire (who also works with Phats & Small under the alias 'Jimmy Gomez').

Biography

2005–2007: Early career
Their name is taken from the Brighton pub, Freemasons Tavern, which they frequently visit. The duo also record and remix under the similar-sounding "Freemaison" name, which is also the name of their record label that was founded in 2005. Freemasons have also produced tracks under the names of Alibi, Walken, Funk Fanatics and BN3 (which is part of their hometown of Hove's postal code).

In 2005, the duo transformed Jackie Moore's 1979 #1 Billboard Hot Dance Club Play track "This Time Baby", and Tina Turner's 1999 hit "When the Heartache Is Over", into an international nightclub hit as "Love on My Mind". A #11 hit in the UK, it was also released in the United States on their U.S. label, the New York based Ultra Records.

Freemasons were also the remixers on Faith Evans' 2005 #1 Hot Dance Club Play and #4 Hot Dance Airplay hit, "Mesmerized". Their follow-up song, "Watchin'" was released in the United States in 2006 with Amanda Wilson as the lead vocalist for the track. "Watchin'" peaked at #1 on the Hot Dance Club Play and within the Top 20 of the Hot Dance Airplay chart. The third original single from Freemasons, "Rain Down Love", reached the Top 20 of the Hot Dance Airplay chart. Their fourth single (released digitally), "Nothing but a Heartache" featuring vocals from Sylvia Mason-James, was released in June 2007. Freemasons also remixed Beyoncé's original song, "Déjà Vu" in 2006 (for which they were nominated for a Grammy Award). They followed this up with further remixes of "Ring the Alarm", "Beautiful Liar" (duet with Shakira), and "Green Light". They also co-produced "The One" on Kylie Minogue's album X with Richard Stannard and remixed the song for single release in May 2008.

2007–2009: Unmixed and Shakedown 2
On 29 October 2007, Freemasons released Unmixed, an album containing unmixed versions of most of their mixes to date. As a bonus, there is a data track containing samples and a cappella versions of "Unmixed". In 2007, Freemasons worked with Kelly Rowland, to produce the remix of her single "Work", for the non-American markets. That same year they were rumored to be producing an album for Donna Summer, but the project fell through due to scheduling commitments.

The follow-up to their own version of "Uninvited", "When You Touch Me", was released in the UK on 30 June 2008. The song featured Katherine Ellis. The music video premiered in May 2008. The song entered the UK Singles Chart in June 2008 and reached its peak of #23 on 6 July.

Beyoncé's sister, Solange Knowles used the duo's production skills to create her single "I Decided" for its release in 2008.

On 15 June 2009, Freemasons released the song "Heartbreak (Make Me a Dancer)", featuring Sophie Ellis-Bextor, in the UK. The single peaked at #13 in the UK, making it their fifth Top 20 hit on the UK Singles Chart, and was a smash hit on the club charts. It had success in the European charts. X Factor 2008 winner Alexandra Burke confirmed on her official website that Freemasons had produced tracks for her debut album.

2010–present: Shakedown 3
The duo released a remix EP Summer of Pride Mix digitally on 15 August 2010 which peaked at #23 on the UK Dance Singles Chart. The single (including an edited version) was released in the UK on 5 December 2010. "Believer" features R&B singer Wynter Gordon.

In April 2012, Russell discussed with fans after a gig in Bournemouth about talk of signing a new contract on Ministry of Sound's label, to release an album in early 2013. He is quoted as saying, "It's still early days, however they have said that they will want lots of collaborations. It's something to look forward to."

Wiltshire now produces music with F9-Audio F9-audio. Small continues to DJ around the world and produce music with production partner DNO P.

Discography

Freemasons albums

Freemasons singles

Notes

Pegasus singles

Pegasus promotional singles

Remixes

Production credits
 2007 "The One" - Kylie Minogue (Freemasons, R. Stannard)
 2008 "I Decided, Pt. 2" - Solange (Freemasons, The Neptunes)
 2010 "Bittersweet" - Sophie Ellis-Bextor (Freemasons, Biffco)

References

External links
 Russell Small Music
 www.freemasonsmusic.com

English house music duos
Electronic dance music duos
Male musical duos
Remixers
Musical groups from Brighton and Hove
DJs from Brighton and Hove
DJ duos
Ultra Records artists